Archibald Malcolm Benn (20 January 1897 – 3 April 1980) was an Australian politician. Born in Branxholme, Victoria, he was educated in Melbourne before moving to Queensland as a teenager where he worked as a shearer, and later as a public servant. He was Director of Labour in Queensland during World War II. In 1949, he was elected to the Australian Senate as a Labor Senator for Queensland. He remained a Senator until his term expired in 1968. Benn died in 1980 in Melbourne.

References

1897 births
1980 deaths
Australian Labor Party members of the Parliament of Australia
Members of the Australian Senate for Queensland
Members of the Australian Senate
20th-century Australian politicians